Some siliceous remains from the Eocene of Barbados can be interpreted as dinoflagellate thecae of the dinoflagellate Peridinites. These have previously been interpreted as dinocysts.

References

Dinoflagellate biology
Palynology